The Praecuvierinidae are a family of extinct, small, floating sea snails, pelagic marine opisthobranch gastropod mollusks in the superfamily Cavolinioidea.

Genera 

 Genus Praecuvierina Janssen, 2005
 Praecuvierina lura (Hodgkinson, in Hodgkinson, Garvie & Bé, 1992) - from Eocene, Lutetian of the United States
 Genus Texacuvierina Janssen, 2005
 Texacuvierina gutta (Hodgkinson, in Hodgkinson, Garvie & Bé, 1992) - from Eocene, Bartonian of the United States

References 

 
Cavolinioidea